Linjeflyg was a Swedish domestic airline, formed in 1957 as a domestic subsidiary by Scandinavian Airlines System and Airtaco as well as by newspaper publishers Dagens Nyheter AB and Stockholms-Tidningen AB.

History 
Airtaco (founded in August 1950 as Aero Scandia) can be considered as Linjeflyg's predecessor and was merged into the new airline, including its entire fleet. When Linjeflyg was founded, Airtaco's four Lockheed Model 18 Lodestars and four Douglas DC-3s were integrated into the new fleet.

In October 1983 Linjeflyg moved from Stockholm-Bromma Airport in the central part of Stockholm to Stockholm-Arlanda Airport in the north of Stockholm. Bromma had been the main hub for Linjeflyg since 1957. On 10 September 1990 Scandinavian Airlines System (SAS) sold their 50% in Linjeflyg to Bilspedition for 475 million Swedish crowns (SEK). Approximately six months later SAS bought it back.

In February 1992 Linjeflyg became too big a threat for SAS, because it planned a strategic alliance with Braathens and Maersk Air. Such an alliance would have been too competitive for SAS on the intra-Scandinavian capital routes and on domestic flights. Consequently SAS bought up the 50% of Linjeflyg that it did not already own, to maintain its market dominance. On 1 January 1993 Linjeflyg was merged into SAS. Linjeflyg was Sweden's largest domestic airline. It served over 20 domestic airports and carried over 5 million people annually. Linjeflyg had 2200 employees in 1992, and was at that time the largest Fokker F28 operator in the world.

Fleet

Incidents and accidents
On 20 November 1964 Flight 267V, operated by Convair 440 SE-CCK, crashed during an approach to Ängelholm joint civil/military Airport. In instrument conditions, the crew abandoned the set procedure and began the final approach too early. The reason for this must have been that the crew allowed themselves to be misled by an arrangement of lights peculiar to the airfield with which, apart from certain information received during the approach, they were not acquainted. Thirty-one of the 43 people aboard were killed in Sweden's worst air disaster.
On 15 January 1977 Flight 618, operated by Vickers Viscount SE-FOZ leased from Skyline, crashed at Kälvesta on approach to Bromma Airport, Stockholm owing to ice accretion on the tailplane leading to a loss of control. All 22 people on board were killed.

See also
SAS Group
Scandinavian Airlines
List of defunct airlines of Europe

References

Notes

Bibliography
 Edlund, Ulf; Andersson, Lennart; Berns, Lennart; Stridsberg, Sven: Svensk flyghistoria under 1900-talet. Stockholm: Svensk Flyghistorisk Förening, 2003. ISSN 1100-9837.

External links

 linjeflyg.info - private website about Linjeflyg

 
Defunct airlines of Sweden
Airlines established in 1957
Airlines disestablished in 1993
SAS Group
Swedish companies established in 1957
Swedish companies disestablished in 1993